Actia solida is a species of tachinid flies in the genus Actia of the family Tachinidae.

References

Diptera of Asia
solida
Insects described in 1998